Órfhlaith Begley (born 19 December 1991) is an Irish Sinn Féin politician. She is the Member of Parliament (MP) for the West Tyrone constituency of the British House of Commons, having first won the seat in a by-election on 3 May 2018. Prior to her political career, Begley was a solicitor.

Early life and career 
Begley was born on 19 December 1991 in Carrickmore, County Tyrone, Northern Ireland. She is the daughter of former Sinn Féin Omagh District Council chairman Seán Begley. Begley grew up in Carrickmore, and played Gaelic football at the local club. She studied Law and Politics at the Queen's University Belfast. She then studied at the Institute of Professional and Legal Studies, graduating as a solicitor. Begley then worked as a solicitor in Portadown, County Armagh with her brother.

Political career
Begley was selected as the Sinn Féin candidate for West Tyrone in the 2018 West Tyrone by-election on 26 February. The by-election had been called following the resignation of the previous Sinn Féin MP Barry McElduff on 15 January. She was elected with a majority of 7,956. Begley was the first female MP to represent the constituency since it was created in 1997. She held the seat in the 2019 general election with a majority of 7,478. She does not sit in the House of Commons per the party's longstanding policy of abstentionism.

Personal life
Begley became engaged to Conor Carson in February 2021, and they were married in December 2022 in Carrickmore.

References

1991 births
Alumni of Queen's University Belfast
Female members of the Parliament of the United Kingdom for Northern Irish constituencies
Living people
Members of the Parliament of the United Kingdom for County Tyrone constituencies (since 1922)
People from County Tyrone
Sinn Féin MPs (post-1921)
UK MPs 2017–2019
UK MPs 2019–present
21st-century women politicians from Northern Ireland